Naamcheen is a 1991 Hindi language crime thriller film directed, produced and written by Ajit Diwani, starring Aditya Pancholi, Ekta Sohini in the lead roles. Satish Shah plays an important supporting role. Raza Murad and Gulshan Grover play the rival gangsters.

Cast
Aditya Pancholi as Rajan
Ekta Sohini as Jyoti
Satish Shah as Satya
Raza Murad as Jaleel
Gulshan Grover as Rana 
Jagdish Raj as Rajan's Father
Suhas Joshi as Rajan's Mother

Soundtrack
The soundtrack is composed by Anu Malik with lyrics by Dev Kohli, Dalip Tahir and Shailey Shailendra.

External links

1991 films
Films scored by Anu Malik
1990s Hindi-language films